Events in the year 1924 in Japan. It corresponds to Taishō 13 (大正13年) in the Japanese calendar.

Incumbents
Emperor: Taishō
Regent: Hirohito
Prime Minister:
Yamamoto Gonnohyōe (until January 7)
Kiyoura Keigo (from January 7 until June 11)
Katō Takaaki (from June 11)

Governors
Aichi Prefecture: Masahiro Ota (until 11 June); Haruki Yamawaki (starting 11 June)
Akita Prefecture: 
 until 18 June: Masao Kishimoto
 18 June-1 December: Hideo Ikeda
 starting 1 December: Miki Nagano 
Aomori Prefecture: 
 until 6 June: Kazue Baba 
 6 June-24 June: Ichiro Ogata 
 starting 24 June: Matsubara Kenshiro
Ehime Prefecture: Juunosuke Miyazaki (until 24 June); Yoshifumi Satake (starting 24 June)
Fukui Prefecture: 
 until 4 June: Josuke Shiraogawa
 4 June-23 July: Takasuke Fukunaga
 starting 23 July: Katsuzo Toyota 
Fukushima Prefecture: Kosaka Masayasu 
Gifu Prefecture: Manpei Ueda (until 24 June); Takekai Shirane (starting 24 June)
Gunma Prefecture: Yamaoka Kunitoshi (until 23 July); Ushidzuka Torataro (starting 23 July)
Hiroshima Prefecture: Jiro Yamagata 
Ibaraki Prefecture: Shohei Fujinuma (until 9 January); Tsugino Daisaburo (starting 9 January)
Iwate Prefecture: Ushidzuka Torataro (until 23 July); Akira Gotoyu (starting 23 July)
Kagawa Prefecture: Nakagawa Kenzo (until 24 June); Asari Saburo (starting 24 June)
Kanagawa Prefecture: Seino Chotarno 
Kochi Prefecture: Fujioka Hyoichi 
Kumamoto Prefecture: Chisato Tanaka (until 24 June); Nakagawa Kenzō (starting 24 June)
Kyoto Prefecture: Tokikazu Ikematsu (until December); Hiroshi Ikeda (starting December)
Mie Prefecture: 
 until 13 March: Tago Ilman 
 13 March-23 July: Ryo Chiba
 starting 23 July: Kunitoshi Yamaoka
Miyagi Prefecture: Yuichiro Chikaraishi (until 24 June); Manbei Ueda (starting 24 June)
Miyazaki Prefecture: Saito Munenori 
Nagano Prefecture: Toshio Honma
Niigata Prefecture: Ohara Sanarata 
Okayama Prefecture: Masao Kishimoto
Okinawa Prefecture: Ki Iwamoto (until 24 June); Mitsumasa Kamei (starting 24 June)
Saga Prefecture: Tominaga (until 23 July); Saito (starting 23 July)
Saitama Prefecture: Motoda Tashio (until 24 June); Saito Morikuni (starting 24 June)
Shiga Prefecture: Kaiichiro Suematsu 
Shiname Prefecture: Naganobu Ren (until 24 June); Sotaro Taro (starting 24 June)
Tochigi Prefecture: Haruki Yamawaki (until 13 June); Otsuka (starting 13 June)
Tokyo: Katsuo Usami 
Toyama Prefecture: Kihachiro Ito (until 23 July); Masao Oka (starting 23 July)
Yamagata Prefecture: 
 until 24 June: Agata Shinobu
 24 June-17 December: Masao Kishimoto
 starting 17 December:

Events
January 26 – The future Emperor Shōwa marries Princess Kuninomiya Nagako. 
February 2 – Toyama Toy Manufacturing, as predecessor of Takara Tomy founded.
May 4–July 27 – Japan competed at the 1924 Summer Olympics in Paris, France. Japan fielded a team of 28 athletes, who competed in four events.
May 10 – 1924 Japanese general election: No party won a majority of seats, resulting in Kenseikai, Rikken Seiyūkai and the Kakushin Club forming the country's first coalition government led by Katō Takaaki.
 May 26 – The Asian Exclusion Act is enacted by the United States. Its broad discrimination against Asia is seen as the spark that spurred Japan down the path against their former allies into World War II.    
August 1 – Koshien Stadium open in Hyogo Prefecture.
November date unknown – Mogamiya, as predecessor of Bourbon Confectionery founded in Kashiwazaki, Niigata Prefecture.
November 29 – Tokyo Broadcasting Station, as public associatied corporate,  was founded, later, Japan Broadcasting Corporation (NHK). 
December 27 – A dynamite explosion during logistic handling work in Temiya Station, Otaru, Hokkaido, resulting to death toll was 94 persons, according to Japanese government official confirmed report.
Unknown date
 Takarazuka Grand Theater, official open in Hyogo Prefecture.
 Fukuoka Mujin, as predecessor of Nishinippon City Bank was established in Fukuoka Prefecture.

Births
February 18 – Fubuki Koshiji, actress and singer (d. 1980)
February 24 – Chikage Awashima, film actress (d. 2012)
February 26 – Noboru Takeshita, 74th Prime Minister of Japan  (d. 2000)
March 3 – Tomiichi Murayama, 81st Prime Minister of Japan
March 7 – Kōbō Abe, writer, playwright and photographer (d. 1993)
March 25 – Machiko Kyō, film  actress (d. 2019)
March 27 – Hideko Takamine, film actress  (d. 2010)
April 13 – Junnosuke Yoshiyuki, novelist (d. 1994)
April 29 – Shintaro Abe, politician (d. 1991)
September 3 – Yosihiko H. Sinoto, anthropologist (d. 2017)
October 1 – Nobuko Otowa, film actress (d. 1994)
October 9 – Hachiro Kasuga, enka singer (d. 1991)
November 3 – Toyoko Yamasaki, novelist (d. 2013)
November 13 – Motoo Kimura, geneticist (d. 1994)
November 25 – Takaaki Yoshimoto, poet, literary critic, and philosopher (d. 2012)
December 1 – Masao Horiba, businessman (d. 2015)

Deaths
January 11 – Takamiyama Torinosuke, Sumo wrestler (b. 1873) 
January 27 – Hasegawa Yoshimichi, field marshal (b. 1850)
March 24 – Prince Kachō Hirotada, army lieutenant (b. 1902)
April 26 – Ijūin Hikokichi, diplomat and politician (b. 1864)
July 2 – Matsukata Masayoshi, 4th (and 6th) Prime Minister of Japan (b. 1835)
July 15 – Kuroda Seiki, painter and teacher (b. 1866)
July 30 – Fusanosuke Gotō, Military personnel (b. 1879)
October 24 – Nashiba Tokioki, admiral (b. 1850)
November 15 – Daisuke Namba, communist activist (b. 1899)
December 8 – Bochō Yamamura, writer, poet and songwriter (b. 1884)
December 24 – Nakamura Tsune, yōga painter (b. 1887)
December 31 – Tomioka Tessai, Nanga painter and calligrapher (b. 1837)

See also
List of Japanese films of the 1920s

References

 
1920s in Japan
Japan
Years of the 20th century in Japan